David Jennings may refer to:

Dave Jennings (American football) (1952–2013), former American football punter and broadcaster
David Jennings (State Representative) (1835–1906), Wisconsin State Representative
David Jennings (bishop) (born 1944), English churchman
David Jennings (composer) (born 1972), British composer
David Jennings (congressman) (1787–1834), United States Representative from Ohio
David Jennings (cricketer) (1889–1918), English cricketer who died during the First World War
David Jennings (tutor) (1691–1762), English dissenting tutor
David M. Jennings (born 1948), former Speaker of the Minnesota House of Representatives
David V. Jennings (1887–1970), Wisconsin state senator